The Renault Clio Rally3 is a rally car developed and built by Renault Sport for the Groups Rally regulation of the Rally3 category. It is based upon the Renault Clio road car and is set to make its debut in 2023.

Development
The Renault Clio Rally3 was revealed in 2022. The car completes the Renault Clio ladder in relation to the Groups Rally regulation with its Rally4 and Rally5 variants, and would be Renault's first all-wheel drive challenger. The car is the straight rival to the Ford Fiesta Rally3 of M-Sport, which is only available Rally3 car for competition.

During the period when the car is under development, it was testing in France in 2022. The car is set to be launched in the second half of 2023, eligible to compete in both European Rally Championship and World Rally Championship-3, as well as its junior category.

References

External links
  

All-wheel-drive vehicles
Clio Rally3
Rally3 cars